Okhla Vihar is a new settlement in Okhla, in the district of South East Delhi, India. It consists of many lanes (roads) and many sub-lanes (sub-roads). Over 80% of the area of Okhla Vihar is covered with 5-story apartments. The area consists of three mosques and a church. Amanatullah Khan is the local M.L.A (member of the Legislative Assembly) from AAP (Aam Admi Party).

Location 
Jamia Nagar is one of the religious-ethnic enclaves of Delhi, much like Chittaranjan Park (Bengalis) and Tilak Nagar (Sikhs), where Delhi shows its class and religious divides. Jamia Nagar is located on the coasts of Yamuna river which divides Delhi from Uttar Pradesh.

Okhla Vihar is very close to the campus of Jamia Millia University with its parks and ponds, trees and benches, ducks and cuckoos and very near to Johri Farm, Janta Flats, and Jasola.

Okhla Vihar has many nursing homes and maternity centers such as Iqbal Faizy Hospital, Riaz Medical Centre, and Sabir Nursing Home.

There is also a primary school, St. Mary Cambridge School.

Transport 
Okhla Vihar is a ten-minute drive from the business hubs Nehru Place. River Yamuna, Escorts Hospital, Jamia Millia Islamia University, Holy Family Hospital. Rickshaws, e-rickshaws, auto-rickshaws, cabs, and taxis are the main forms of public transport. Transport is available to nearby commercial and official areas such as NOIDA (New Okhla Industrial Development Authority), Nehru Place, Sarita Vihar, Jasola, Johri Farm, Okhla Industrial Area, and Okhla Railway Station. A metro train network is also proposed by 2016 to Kalindi Kunj. A metro train station will be present 10–20 meters from Mother Dairy Jasola. For travelling to nearby places, there are many e-rickshaws charging 10-30 rupees. The nearby bus stop is Tikona park, just in front of Jamia Millia Islamia metro station from where one can take DTC (Delhi Transport Corporation) bus routes 507 (ARSD/Dhaula Kuan), 402 (Babarpur), 403 (Old Delhi Railway Station), 274, 463, and 894 (Karampura terminal).

Economy
The economy of the area is diverse. Apart from a wholesale market, property sales, schools, mosques, and church, other places of interest in and around the area include Jamia Millia Islamia, New Friends Colony, Maharani Bagh, Johri Farm, Holy Family Hospital, Apollo Hospital, Escort and Fortis Hospitals, Kalka Mandir, Lotus Temple, Okhla Railway Station, Crowne Plaza Hotel and the Computer Market in Nehru Place. A number of non-vegetarian restaurants are also present in the colony such as Rafeek Nihari hotel, Ateek Hotel, and Nusrat Hotel. There is also an adjacent colony situated in Janta Flats.

See also
Jamia Millia Islamia
Johri Farm
Shaheen Bagh

Villages in South Delhi district